Farmersburg is the name of two places in the United States:
Farmersburg, Indiana
Farmersburg, Iowa
Elk County, Kansas, an abandoned town